is a Japanese ice hockey goaltender for the Seibu Rabbits.

International career
Konishi was selected for the Japan women's national ice hockey team in the 2014 Winter Olympics. She played in one game, not allowing a goal in relief of Nana Fujimoto. She also competed at the 2018 Winter Olympics.

Konishi made two appearances for the Japan women's national under-18 ice hockey team at the IIHF World Women's U18 Championships, with the first in 2012.

Career statistics

International career
Through 2014–15 season

References

External links

1995 births
Living people
Japanese women's ice hockey goaltenders
Olympic ice hockey players of Japan
Ice hockey players at the 2014 Winter Olympics
Ice hockey players at the 2018 Winter Olympics
Ice hockey players at the 2022 Winter Olympics
Asian Games medalists in ice hockey
Asian Games gold medalists for Japan
Ice hockey players at the 2017 Asian Winter Games
Medalists at the 2017 Asian Winter Games
People from Kushiro, Hokkaido